Allan H. Treman State Marine Park is a  state park and marina located in the City of Ithaca in Tompkins County, New York, United States. The park is located at the south end of Cayuga Lake, one of the 11 Finger Lakes of New York. The park's namesake, Allan Hosie Treman (1899-1975) was a Cornell University law professor, Ithaca city counsel, and member of the Finger Lakes Park Commission. He is the son of Robert H. Treman, who also has a state park named in his honor.

Park description
Allan H. Treman State Marine Park offers an eight-lane boat launch and a marina that includes 370 seasonal, 30 transient and 30 dry boat slips. Boats launched at the facility have easy access to the New York State Canal System. Fishing, birdwatching opportunities (waterfowl and wetland species), and picnic tables are also available at the park.

Gallery

See also
 List of New York state parks

References

External links
 New York State Parks: Allan H. Treman

Marine parks of New York (state)
State parks of New York (state)
Parks in Tompkins County, New York
Tourist attractions in Ithaca, New York